is a former professional baseball player from Japan.  Ejiri played baseball for the Taiyo Whales. He eventually served as a manager for the Chiba Lotte Marines

External links

References

1943 births
Living people
Baseball people from Ibaraki Prefecture
Waseda University alumni
Japanese baseball players
Nippon Professional Baseball outfielders
Taiyō Whales players
Yokohama Taiyō Whales players
Managers of baseball teams in Japan
Yokohama DeNA BayStars managers
Chiba Lotte Marines managers